Šentjur na Polju is a small village on the left bank of the Sava River in the Municipality of Sevnica in central Slovenia. The area is part of the historical region of Styria. The municipality is now included in the Lower Sava Statistical Region.

Name
The name of the settlement was changed from Sveti Jurij pri Loki (literally, 'Saint George near Loka') to Šentjur na Polju in 1955.

Church
The local church from which the settlement gets its name is dedicated to Saint George (contracted to Šentjur) and belongs to the Parish of Loka pri Zidanem Mostu. It is a medieval building with a Romanesque floor plan that was restyled in the Baroque in the 17th century.

References

External links
Šentjur na Polju at Geopedia

Populated places in the Municipality of Sevnica